Charles Yriarte (Paris 5 December 1832  – 10 April 1898 Paris) was a French writer and draughtsman, although his family was originally from Spain. He studied architecture in the École des Beaux-Arts and in 1856 became inspector of government buildings. Later, he joined the Spanish army as reporter for Le Monde Illustré during the Spanish campaign in Morocco. He travelled in Spain and Italy and became the magazine's editor after his return in 1862. In 1871, he quit his post to devote time to traveling, and his impressions were later used in his works. Some of his writings were published under the pseudonyms "Junior" and "Le Marquis de Villemer".

Works
La Société espagnole (Par. 1861)
Sous la tente, souvenir du Maroc (1862)
Les Célébrités de la rue (1864)
Paris grotesque, les célébrités de la rue 1815-63 (2. Ed. 1868)
Les Cercles de Paris, 1828-64 (1865)
Portraits parisiens (1865)
Nouveaux portraits parisiens (1869)
Goya, sa vie, son œuvre (1867)
Portraits cosmopolites (1870)
Tableaux de la guerre (1870)
Les Prussiens à Paris et le 18 mars (1871)
Campagne de France 1870-71 (1871)
Les Princes d'Orléans (1872)
Le Puritain (1873)
L'Istrie et la Dalmatie (1874)
Trieste e l'Istria (1875)
La Bosnie et l'Herzégovine pendant l'insurrection (1875)
Bosnie et Herzégovine: souvenirs de voyage pendant l'insurrection (1876)
Venise: l'histoire, l'art, l'industrie, la ville et la vie (1877)
Les Bords de l'Adriatique (1878)
Florence (1880)
Un condottiere au XV. siecle: Rimini (1882)
Françoise de Rimini (1882)
La vie d'un patricien de Venise au XVI. siècle (von der Akademie gekrönt, 2. Ed. 1885)
Matteo Civitali, sa vie et son œuvre (1885)
Paul Véronèse (1888)
Cesar Borgia (1889) 2 Vols.
Les Fleurs et les jardins de Paris (1893)
Mantegna (1901)

References

French travel writers
Writers from Paris
1832 births
1898 deaths
19th-century French journalists
French male journalists
French people of Spanish descent
École des Beaux-Arts alumni
French male writers
19th-century French male writers